Heinrich Mauersberger (1909–1982) was a German textile inventor. He is credited with inventing Malimo, a technique for stitch bonding,  in 1949. He was awarded the patent DD000000008194A. The series of Malimo was further developed by the Chemnitz-based company Karl Mayer.

References 

20th-century German inventors
Patent holders
1909 births
1982 deaths